Morgan O'Flaherty is a Gaelic footballer for Kildare. He plays Gaelic football for his local club Carbury and has been a member of the Kildare senior team since 2008. His younger brother Eoghan is also a member of the senior team.

References

External links

Year of birth missing (living people)
Living people
Kildare inter-county Gaelic footballers